Wilhelm Burgsmüller (born 18 January 1932 in Dortmund) is a German former football defender who played for Borussia Dortmund between 1952 and 1966. He appeared 19 times for the club in the inaugural Bundesliga season.

Honours

Club
Borussia Dortmund
 German football championship: 1956, 1957, 1963

References

External links
 

1932 births
German footballers
Association football defenders
Borussia Dortmund players
Bundesliga players
Living people
Footballers from Dortmund